Amexica is a 2010 American short film written and directed by Ronald Krauss and starring Joseph Ferrante, AnnaLynne McCord and Kelly Wing. It has won "Best Short Film" at such festivals as the  Palm Springs International Festival of Short Films, Mexico International Film Festival, the Hawaii International Film Festival in Honolulu, Malibu International Film Festival, and The Beijing International Film Festival.

Premise
A couple of con artists buy a young boy from a child trafficking ring and use him for a get-rich scheme in a series of false roads accidents.

Cast
Joseph Ferrante as Man
AnnaLynne McCord as Woman
Jordan James as Boy
Gloria Sandoval as El Pastor
Bernadette Wysocki as Accident Victim #1
Cary Joseph as Doctor
David Schroeder as Accident Victim #2
Yasmine Nickle as Girl with doll
Andres Salazar as Trafficker
AJ Anselmo as Boy in warehouse
Alexa Gardner as Girl in warehouse
Hannah Taylor Greene as Child at playground
Bonnie Hellman as Waitress
Jenny M. Rich as Receptionist
Evan Lake Schelton as Child at playground
Kelly Wing as Entrepreneur
Ronnie Flynn as Ronald

References

External links
 

American short films
2010s Spanish-language films
2010s English-language films
Films about Mexican Americans
Spanish-language American films